Torolf is a Norwegian given name that may refer to
Torolf Eklund (1912–2000), Finnish aircraft designer
Torolf Elster (1911–2006), Norwegian newspaper and radio journalist
Torolf Juell (1897–1983), Norwegian military officer and judge
Torolf Nordbø (born 1956), Norwegian musician and comedian 
Torolf Prytz (1858–1938), Norwegian architect, goldsmith and politician 
Torolf Raa (born 1933), Norwegian diplomat
Torolf Rein (born 1934), Norwegian military officer
Arne Torolf Strøm (1901–1972), Norwegian politician